The 22nd Golden Bell Awards was held on 21 March 1987 at the Taipei City Arts Promotion Office in Taipei, Taiwan. The ceremony was broadcast by Taiwan Television (TTV).

Winners

References

1987
1987 in Taiwan